Azizi-ye Vosta (also Romanized as ‘Azīzī-ye Vosţá) is a village in Sarfaryab Rural District, Sarfaryab District, Charam County, Kohgiluyeh and Boyer-Ahmad Province, Iran. At the 2006 census, its population was 131, in 29 families.

References 

Populated places in Charam County